is a former Japanese football player.

Club career
Motoyoshi was born in Yokohama on July 26, 1967. After graduating from Chuo University, he joined Fujita Industries in 1990. He became a regular player as center back. In 1991, he moved to Mitsubishi Motors (later Urawa Reds). However his opportunity to play decreased in 1994 and he moved to Japan Football League club Otsuka Pharmaceutical in 1995. He moved to Tokyo Gas in 1997. Although the club was promoted to new league J2 League end of 1998 season, he retired end of 1998 season.

National team career
In 1988, when Motoyoshi was a Chuo University student, he was selected Japan national "B team" for 1988 Asian Cup. At this competition, he played 1 game. However, Japan Football Association don't count as Japan national team match because this Japan team was "B team" not "top team"

Club statistics

References

External links

1967 births
Living people
Chuo University alumni
Association football people from Kanagawa Prefecture
Japanese footballers
Japan Soccer League players
J1 League players
Japan Football League (1992–1998) players
Shonan Bellmare players
Urawa Red Diamonds players
Tokushima Vortis players
FC Tokyo players
1988 AFC Asian Cup players
Association football defenders